Greatest Hits is a compilation album released by funk band Rose Royce on the Whitfield label in 1980. All tracks were produced by Norman Whitfield.

History
The album reached number one on the UK Albums Chart. Two original songs were released as singles, "Pop Your Fingers" and "You're a Winner". "Pop Your Fingers" peaked at No. 60 on the Billboard R&B Singles chart, while "You're a Winner" failed to chart.

Track listing

North American version

European version

Charts

Singles

References

External links
 
 

1980 greatest hits albums
Rose Royce albums
Albums produced by Norman Whitfield